The Mitsubishi Heavy Industries Crystal Mover C810D is an automated people mover vehicle which serves the Sengkang LRT line and Punggol LRT line as the third generation train after their previous counterparts Mitsubishi Heavy Industries Crystal Mover C810 and Mitsubishi Heavy Industries Crystal Mover C810A.

Overview
On 5 February 2021, the Land Transport Authority announced that it has purchased 17 two-car trains for the Sengkang and Punggol LRT systems. The new trains will be delivered progressively from 2024 to 2027. In addition to new trains, the Sengkang Depot will also be expanded to 11.1 ha from the existing 3.5 ha to ensure that it has capacity and maintenance space for the new trains. The expansion of the depot will also see two new reception tracks being built to shorten the train launching time. To ensure there is enough electricity to support the larger fleet of trains, 3 new power stations will be built, increasing the total number of power stations supporting the system to 8 once completed.

Train formation
The configuration of a C810D in revenue service is M-M with both the motors and the third rail current collectors.

The car numbers of the trains range from 58 to 74. Individual cars are assigned a two-digit serial number by the rail operator SBS Transit. A complete two-car trainset consists of two motor cars (M-M), e.g. set 58 is car 58. Both digits identify the car number.
 Mitsubishi Heavy Industries built sets 58–74.

References

Crystal Mover people movers

750 V DC multiple units
Light Rail Transit (Singapore) rolling stock